The second season of CSI: Crime Scene Investigation premiered on CBS on September 27, 2001, and ended May 16, 2002. The series stars William Petersen and Marg Helgenberger.

Plot
The murder of a Police Chief leads Willows and Brown to Miami ("Cross Jurisdictions"), in the second season of CSI. The Las Vegas CSIs investigate another series of gruesome, unprecedented, and unsolvable crimes, including the murder of the son of a Las Vegas mogul ("Burked"), the disappearance of a University student ("Chaos Theory"), the death of a construction worker ("Overload"), the discovery of a decomposed body in a bag ("Bully for You"), a scuba diver discovered up a tree in the desert ("Scuba Doobie-Doo"), a fetish murder ("Slaves of Las Vegas"), and a death at a spa ("Alter Boys"). Meanwhile, Catherine and Sara investigate both a suspected suicide-by-train ("Caged") and a homicide at a remote convenience store ("And Then There Were None"), Warrick is given the opportunity to head the crime lab ("Ellie"), Grissom and Willows come to face to face with a serial killer in a courtroom ("Identity Crisis"), and Nick studies the death of a woman who drowned in the desert ("Anatomy of a Lye"), after finding himself the target of a stalker ("Stalker").

Cast

Main cast
 
 William Petersen as CSI Level 3 Night Shift Supervisor Dr. Gil Grissom
 Marg Helgenberger as CSI Level 3 Assistant Night Shift Supervisor Catherine Willows
 Gary Dourdan as CSI Level 3 Warrick Brown
 George Eads as CSI Level 3 Nick Stokes
 Jorja Fox as CSI Level 3 Sara Sidle
 Paul Guilfoyle as LVPD Homicide Unit Captain Jim Brass

Recurring cast

 Robert David Hall as Clark County Coroner's Office Chief Medical Examiner Dr. Al Robbins
 Eric Szmanda as DNA Technician Greg Sanders
 David Berman as Clark County Coroner's Office Assistant Medical Examiner Dr. David Phillips
 Skip O'Brien as LVPD Homicide Detective Sergeant Ray O'Riley
 Archie Kao as Audiovisual Technician Archie Johnson
 Gerald McCullouch as Ballistics Expert Bobby Dawson
 Geoffrey Rivas as LVPD Homicide Detective Sam Vega
 Eric Stonestreet as Questionable Documents Technician Ronnie Litre
 Joseph Patrick Kelly as LVPD Officer Joe Metcalf
 Jeffrey D. Sams as LVPD Homicide Detective Cyrus Lockwood
 Marc Vann as Day Shift Supervisor Conrad Ecklie

 Christopher Wiehl as Hank Peddigrew
 Nicki Aycox as Ellie Rebecca Brass
 Brigid Brannagh as Tammy Felton
 Melinda Clarke as Dr. Heather Kessler, aka Lady Heather
 Susan Gibney as Fingerprint Technician Charlotte Meridian
 Glenn Morshower as Clark County Sheriff Brian Mobley
 Matt O'Toole as Paul Millander/Judge Douglas Mason
 Sheeri Rappaport as Mandy Webster
 Scott Wilson as Sam Braun
 Mark Sheppard as Rod Darling
 Jeremy Renner as Roger Jennings

Crossover stars
 David Caruso as MDPD CSI Level 3 Day Shift Supervisor CSI Lieutenant Horatio "H" Caine (Crossing over with CSI: Miami)
 Emily Procter as MDPD CSI Level 3  Detective Calleigh Duquesne (Crossing over with CSI: Miami)
 Adam Rodriguez as MDPD CSI Level 3 Detective Eric Delko (Crossing over with CSI: Miami)
 Khandi Alexander as Miami-Dade County Medical Examiner Alexx Woods (Crossing over with CSI: Miami)
 Rory Cochrane as MDPD CSI Level 3 Detective Tim Speedle (Crossing over with CSI: Miami)

Episodes

References

External links
 DVD Release Dates at TVShowsOnDVD.com.

02
2001 American television seasons
2002 American television seasons